Kotlice-Kolonia  is a village in the administrative district of Gmina Miączyn, within Zamość County, Lublin Voivodeship, in eastern Poland.

In 2005 the village had a population of 103.

References

Kotlice-Kolonia